Pandigamage Ivanka Sanjula Gamage (born 16 February 1997) is a Sri Lankan cricketer. He made his List A debut for Ratnapura District in the 2016–17 Districts One Day Tournament on 26 March 2017.

References

External links
 

1997 births
Living people
Sri Lankan cricketers
Lankan Cricket Club cricketers
Ratnapura District cricketers
Sportspeople from Galle